Deh Now ( - Persian for "new village"; also known as Tāzeh Kand - Azari for "new village") is a village in Abrumand Rural District, in the Central District of Bahar County, Hamadan Province, Iran. At the 2006 census, its population was 153, in 42 families.

References 

Populated places in Bahar County